Tsinilla ubericolor is a species of moth of the family Tortricidae. It is found in Colombia and Carchi Province, Ecuador.

The wingspan is about 22 mm. The ground colour of the basal third of the forewings is glossy grey with blackish-brown spots. The subterminal area is ferruginous, but silver white in the tornal and ocellar areas. The costal strigulae (fine streaks) are white and the marking are blackish brown. The hindwings are brownish.

Etymology
The species name refers to the colouration of the forewing and is derived from Latin uber (meaning rich).

References

	

Moths described in 2008
Olethreutini
Taxa named by Józef Razowski